Patrick Edward Hunter (born October 24, 1964 in San Francisco, California) is a former American football cornerback who played 10 seasons for the Seattle Seahawks and the Arizona Cardinals from 1986 to 1995. 

Hunter grew up playing football for South San Francisco High School, then was recruited by Chris Ault as a four-year member of the University of Nevada, Reno Wolf Pack (1982-1985).  He was awarded his letter all four years, and appeared in the NCAA Division 1AA national semi-finals after the 1983 and 1985 seasons.

Hunter was drafted by the Seahawks in the third round of the 1986 NFL Draft. Over the course of his 10-year NFL career he played in 125 games (starting 104), logging 14 interceptions (returning one for a touchdown in 1991), 409 solo tackles, and 5 recovered fumbles.

References 

1964 births
Living people
People from South San Francisco, California
Players of American football from San Francisco
American football cornerbacks
Nevada Wolf Pack football players
Seattle Seahawks players
Arizona Cardinals players

https://www.profootballarchives.com/playerh/hunt05600.html